Caught in the Act is Grand Funk Railroad's second live album and was released in August 1975 by Capitol Records as a double album. It was recorded live on tour in 1975 and features "The Funkettes" – Lorraine Feather and Jana Giglio.

Early pressings of the album (including record-club pressings) simply state the band's name as "Grand Funk" on the front cover and spine, but have the full name on the record labels.

The 2003 re-mastered version of this release has a total time of 79:08, and was squeezed down to one disc. The 2:47 "Introduction" is gone, but "T.N.U.C" and "Gimme Shelter" are lengthened. Audience interaction and applause is shortened throughout to compensate. The missing "Introduction" is included as a hidden track at the end of "Some Kind of Wonderful" on the 2003 re-mastered version of "All the Girls in the World Beware!!!"

Track listing 
Side one
 "Footstompin' Music" (Mark Farner) – 4:07
 "Rock & Roll Soul" (Farner) – 4:04
 "Closer to Home" (Farner) – 7:08

Side two
 "Heartbreaker" (Farner) – 7:22
 "Some Kind of Wonderful" (John Ellison) – 4:14
 "Shinin' On" (Farner, Don Brewer) – 5:31
 "The Loco-Motion" (Gerry Goffin, Carole King) – 3:21

Side three
 "Black Licorice" (Farner, Brewer) – 4:27
 "The Railroad" (Farner) – 6:13
 "We're an American Band (Brewer) – 3:38
 "T.N.U.C." (Farner) – 9:32

Side four
 "Inside Looking Out" (John Lomax, Alan Lomax, Eric Burdon, Bryan "Chas" Chandler) – 12:24
 "Gimme Shelter" (Mick Jagger, Keith Richards) – 7:00

Personnel 

 Mark Farner – guitar, harmonica, vocals; organ on "Footstompin' Music"
 Craig Frost – percussion, keyboards, backing vocals
 Mel Schacher – bass guitar, backing vocals
 Don Brewer – drums, percussion, vocals

Funkettes Group
 Lorraine Feather – backing vocals
 Jana Giglio – backing vocals

Charts

References 

1975 live albums
Grand Funk Railroad live albums
Albums produced by Jimmy Ienner
Capitol Records live albums